Carex litorosa, commonly known as sea sedge, is a tussock-forming species of perennial sedge in the family Cyperaceae. It is native to New Zealand.

Description
The sedge has an upright habit and can reach a height of  but is more often smaller. It appears as a reddish to pale green coloured tussocks that have curly tops. They are curved on one side and flat on the other and are slightly serrated along the edges. The upright and cylindrical flower stems produce light brown coloured spikes. The plant flowers between October and December and fruits between December and April although the seed heads can remain for much longer.

Taxonomy
The species was first described in 1889 by the botanist Liberty Hyde Bailey as a part of the Memoirs of the Torrey Botanical Club. It has two synonyms; 
 Carex australis as described by Kirk 
 Carex littoralis described by Petrie.

Distribution
It is often situated along tidal riverbeds that are sandy and in brackish to salty marshlands. Its range is in both the North Island and South Island of New Zealand and well as Stewart Island.

See also
List of Carex species

References

litorosa
Taxa named by Liberty Hyde Bailey
Plants described in 1889
Flora of New Zealand